Socotra Swahili is an extinct variety of Swahili spoken on Socotra Island in Yemen. It was reported to be spoken by a fifth of the island (c. 2,000 people) in 1962.

References

Languages of Yemen
Swahili language
Socotra
Languages of the African diaspora